Alcovy High School is a public school in Covington, Georgia, United States. It is part of the Newton County School System.

History
Alcovy High School opened to serve grades 9 to 12 in the 2006–2007 school year. The school was built to relieve the population of Newton High School and Eastside High School. The school was built with 82 classrooms, and it has room to accommodate up to 2,500 students.

The class schedule originally was six periods. In 2009, the Newton County School System changed all high schools to a four-block schedule. In 2011, it changed all high schools to a six-period schedule, which changed graduation credit requirements starting with the class of 2012.  In 2008, the school added classrooms and a Ninth Grade Academy, which opened in the fall of 2010. The class of 2014 was the first to use it.

In 2010, the school was rezoned and students from Newton High School were transferred to Alcovy so that the school system could change Newton into housing for STEM students going to the career academy in 2013. Another building was added for Newton.

Alcovy's first graduating class was the class of 2007.

In 2009, Alcovy High served as a filming location for Rob Zombie's Halloween II, as the exterior of a hospital.

In 2011, the school hosted WAGA-TV's "High Five Field Trip" on the Fox 5 Morning News.

Organizations and clubs
Alcovy offers a variety of clubs and service organizations:

 DECA
 FCCLA
 Key Club
 FFA
 FCA
 JCL
 Naturalist Club
 FBLA
 International Thespian Society
 National Art Honor Society
 Anime Club
 Anchor Club
 ATB (Alcovy Tiger Band)
 Hard Knocks Step Team
 Reading Bowl
 Literary Team
 Alcovy Tiger Chorus
 Harmonic Tigers (female a cappella group)
 Ledger Lines (male a cappella group)
 Voices of Praise Gospel Choir
 Tri-M Music Honor Society
 International Club

Sports
Football
Basketball (men's and women's)
Cheerleading
Softball
Golf
Baseball
Cross country
Track & field
Volleyball
Wrestling
Soccer (men's and women's)
Tennis

Notable alumni
D'Anthony Bell - NFL - Cleveland Browns #37

References

External links 

 

Educational institutions established in 2006
Public high schools in Georgia (U.S. state)
Schools in Newton County, Georgia
2006 establishments in Georgia (U.S. state)